Provogue Records is a European record label and part of the Mascot Label Group. Founded by Jan Van Der Linden in the early 1990s, the label specializes in rock and blues. Its catalog includes Gary Moore, Joe Bonamassa, Beth Hart, Eric Johnson, Robert Cray, Gov't Mule, Philip Sayce, and Warren Haynes.

Roster
 Gary Moore
 Bernie Marsden
 Beth Hart
 Eric Johnson
 Gov't Mule
 Innes Sibun
 Jay Hooks
 JJ Grey & MOFRO
 Joe Bonamassa
 Jonny Lang
 Kenny Wayne Shepherd
 Leslie West
 Matt Schofield
 Michael Katon
 Michael Landau
 No Sinner
 Omar Kent Dykes
 Philip Sayce
 Quinn Sullivan
 Rob Tognoni
 The Rides
 Robben Ford
 Robert Cray
 Supersonic Blues Machine
 Walter Trout
 Warren Haynes

References

External links
 Official site

Dutch record labels
Blues record labels